Sallie Manzanet-Daniels  is an associate justice of the New York Appellate Division of the Supreme Court, First Judicial Department.

Early life and education
She is a 1985 graduate of Marymount Manhattan College and a 1988 graduate of Hofstra University School of Law. Manzanet-Daniels is married to Randy Daniels.

Legal career
Prior to joining the bench, she was a criminal defense practitioner for the Legal Aid Society in the Bronx. She also worked as a Principal Law Clerk to  Justice Frank Torres in Bronx Supreme Court and to Justice Luis A. Gonzalez, the then Administrative Judge for the 12th Judicial District.

She subsequently served on the New York City Civil Court from 1999 to 2001. She was a New York Supreme Court Justice, from 2001 to 2009. She was designated a Justice for the Appellate Division, First Judicial Department in 2009 by Governor David Paterson. She was the first woman of Puerto Rican descent to serve on the First Department.

See also
List of Hispanic/Latino American jurists

References

Further reading 
Paterson, David "Black, Blind, & In Charge: A Story of Visionary Leadership and Overcoming Adversity." New York, New York, 2020

Living people
New York (state) lawyers
Hispanic and Latino American judges
Lawyers from New York City
Marymount Manhattan College alumni
Maurice A. Deane School of Law alumni
Year of birth missing (living people)